Michael S. Devany is a former vice admiral in the NOAA Commissioned Officer Corps who last served as the deputy under secretary for operations at the National Oceanic and Atmospheric Administration from January 2, 2014 to April 2016. He previously served as director of the NOAA Commissioned Officer Corps from August 13, 2012 to January 1, 2014, succeeding RADM Jonathan W. Bailey. As deputy under secretary for operations, he was NOAA’s chief operating officer. VADM Devany was responsible for the day-to-day management of NOAA’s national and international operations for oceanic and atmospheric services, research, and coastal and marine stewardship. He is a key advisor to the under secretary of commerce for oceans and atmosphere/NOAA administrator on NOAA program and policy issues. Devany was the first NOAA Corps officer to achieve the rank of vice admiral since VADM Henry A. Karo in 1965, and the second NOAA Corps officer overall. Devany retired from NOAA in April 2016 after over 30 years of combined uniformed service.

Career
VADM Devany was an officer in the National Oceanic and Atmospheric Administration Commissioned Officer Corps (NOAA Corps), one of the nation’s eight uniformed services. He is a graduate of the NOAA Leadership Competencies Development Program and the Harvard Senior Managers in Government program.

As Director, MAOC, RDML Devany was responsible for the safe, efficient and effective operation of the NOAA ship and aircraft fleet. He oversaw NOAA’s multi-purpose oceanographic, fisheries, and hydrographic survey vessels and aircraft that operate across the globe in support of the program requirements of NOAA.

VADM Devany received his commission in the United States Navy via the Navy ROTC in 1986 and has been an officer of the NOAA Commissioned Officer Corps since January 1990, when he transferred uniformed services. While in the Navy, Devany served as a surface warfare officer aboard the destroyer  in the Pacific and the Persian Gulf. VADM Devany received a bachelor's degree from the University of Washington in biology, and a master's degree from the University of South Florida in environmental health. He was promoted to lieutenant in April 1994, lieutenant commander in September 1999, commander in September 2004, and captain in May 2008.

VADM Devany has served aboard six NOAA ships: NOAAS Chapman (R 446), NOAAS Discoverer (R 102), NOAAS Miller Freeman (R 223), and NOAAS Hi’ialakai (R 334) in various capacities, and as commanding officer of NOAAS Oscar Elton Sette (R 335) and NOAAS John N. Cobb (R 552). These vessels were involved in fisheries and oceanographic research operations in the Atlantic, Pacific, and Gulf of Mexico. Ashore, VADM Devany has served in a variety of staff, scientific, and management positions in the NOAA line offices National Marine Fisheries Service, Oceans and Atmospheric Research, Office of Marine and Aviation Operations, and National Ocean Service. He has spent a majority of his career working in assignments that directly interfaced with state and other federal agencies, using his project management and consensus building skills to achieve program objectives. VADM Devany has spent the last several years in senior Fleet operational positions, most recently as Commanding Officer, Marine Operations Center – Atlantic. He was promoted to rear admiral (lower half) in June 2011 and appointed Director, Marine and Aviation Operations Centers (MAOC), the operational arm of NOAA’s Office of Marine and Aviation Operations (OMAO). He was promoted to rear admiral in February 2012 and assumed command of the NOAA Commissioned Corps in August 2012. He was promoted to vice admiral on 2 January 2014 upon assuming duty as deputy undersecretary for operations, only the second officer to reach this rank in the combined history of the NOAA Commissioned Officer Corps and its predecessors, and the first since H. Arnold Karo in 1965.

VADM Devany has been recognized for his outstanding performance of duties, receiving multiple NOAA Special Achievement Awards and the NOAA Corps Commendation Medals. Additionally, while serving in the U.S. Navy he received the Navy and Marine Corps Achievement Medal and the Armed Forces Expeditionary Medal for service in the Persian Gulf. VADM Devany is a NOAA diver, and holds a United States Coast Guard 1,600-gross-ton Master, Oceans license.

Personal life
VADM Devany is from the State of Washington, and he and his wife Tracy Bishop reside in Virginia with their three boys: Brendan, Kieran and Colin.

NOAA Corps dates of rank

Awards and decorations
 Navy Surface Warfare Officer badge
 NOAA Deck Officer
 NOAA Diver insignia
 NOAA Small Craft Command Badge

External links
This article incorporates material taken from the public domain website of the NOAA Corps.

 NOAA Corps
 RDML Michael S. Devany's OMAO Bio
 NOAA's Website
 NOAA Corp's Website
 NOAA Office of Marine and Aviation Operations

Living people
University of Washington College of Arts and Sciences alumni
University of South Florida alumni
National Oceanic and Atmospheric Administration Commissioned Officer Corps admirals
Year of birth missing (living people)